The Nyack Ranger Station Historic District encompasses the remnants of the former ranger station. Only two buildings now remain: the barn, built in 1935 from plans by the National Park Service Branch of Plans and Design, and the fire cache cabin, built by Austin Weikert in 1935.

References

Ranger stations in Glacier National Park (U.S.)
Park buildings and structures on the National Register of Historic Places in Montana
Rustic architecture in Montana
Historic districts on the National Register of Historic Places in Montana
National Register of Historic Places in Flathead County, Montana
Log buildings and structures on the National Register of Historic Places in Montana